Geoff Platt (born July 10, 1985) is a Canadian–Belarusian professional ice hockey player for Tappara of Liiga.

He has also played for the Växjö Lakers of the Swedish Hockey League (SHL), KHL outfit Dinamo Minsk, Ilves Tampere of the Finnish Liiga and the Columbus Blue Jackets and Anaheim Ducks of the National Hockey League (NHL).

Born and raised in Canada, Platt played major junior in the Ontario Hockey League before spending several years between the NHL and its minor league affiliate the American Hockey League (AHL). In 2008 Platt received an offer to join Ilves in Finland, briefly playing in Belarus beforehand. He played in Finland for one season before returning to Minsk the following year, and spent nearly five full seasons with Dinamo before being traded to Lokomotiv in 2013. Platt had previously played for the Canadian national under-18 team, winning a gold medal at the 2003 IIHF World U18 Championships, but in 2012 he acquired Belarusian citizenship, and having satisfied the International Ice Hockey Federation (IIHF) criteria, was able to represent Belarus starting at the 2014 IIHF World Championship held in Minsk.

Playing career
As a youth, Platt played in the 1999 Quebec International Pee-Wee Hockey Tournament with a minor ice hockey team from North York.

Platt played junior ice hockey in the Ontario Hockey League for the North Bay Centennials, Saginaw Spirit and the Erie Otters. He has played in the NHL with the Columbus Blue Jackets and the Anaheim Ducks.

On February 26, 2012, after playing for five years with Kontinental Hockey League's (KHL) Dinamo Minsk, Platt accepted Belarusian citizenship.

In the 2013–14 season, as leading scorer of Dinamo Minsk in the midst of his 6th season with the club, Platt was traded to Lokomotiv Yaroslavl for monetary compensation on December 30, 2013. He was later signed to a two-year contract extension with Lokomotiv through to the 2016 season on January 3, 2014.

On August 16, 2015, a few days before the start of the new KHL season, Lokomotiv Yaroslavl broke the contract with him. Lokomotiv's general manager explained this by the uncertain legal status of foreign players in KHL (Lokomotiv had signed 6 foreign players including him while the limit of foreign players for the Russian clubs is only 5 players in the roster) and by Geoff's lack of the Russian passport. Two days later he signed a contract with CSKA Moscow.

Platt left Moscow upon the conclusion of the 2015–16 campaign and took his game to Sweden, signing with the Växjö Lakers of the Swedish Hockey League (SHL) on June 23, 2016. On December 14, 2016, he returned to CSKA Moscow for a second stint.

On May 7, 2019, Platt signed as a free agent to a two-year contract to continue in the KHL with Avtomobilist Yekaterinburg.

In the midst of his final year under contract with Avtomobilist in the 2020–21, Platt left the club after collecting six points through 28 games and signed for the remainder of the season with Salavat Yulaev Ufa on December 21, 2020.

After the 2022 Russian invasion of Ukraine, he elected to leave the team.

As a free agent, Platt opted to continue his career by returning to the Finnish Liiga and agreed to a one-year contract with JYP Jyväskylä, on July 11, 2022. However, on December 1, he and JYP Jyväskylä agreed to mutually terminate the contract, and then Platt signed with Tappara for the rest of the 2022–23 season.

International play

Platt was a member of the Canadian national under-18 team during the 2003 IIHF World U18 Championships. He scored three goals in seven games as Canada won the gold medal. After acquiring Belarusian citizenship in 2012 and playing the required amount of time in Belarus, Platt became eligible to represent Belarus in 2014. His first IIHF tournament at which he represented Belarus was the 2014 World Championship, which was held in Minsk. Platt scored three goals and two assists as Belarus finished seventh in the tournament.

Personal life
Platt is married to Finnish native Mia Platt since June 2015. They reside in Tampere, Finland during the off-season.

Career statistics

Regular season and playoffs

International

References

External links
 

1985 births
Living people
Anaheim Ducks players
Atlantic City Boardwalk Bullies players
Avtomobilist Yekaterinburg players
Belarusian ice hockey centres
Canadian emigrants to Belarus
Canadian expatriate ice hockey players in Belarus
Canadian expatriate ice hockey players in Russia
Canadian expatriate ice hockey players in Sweden
Canadian ice hockey centres
Columbus Blue Jackets players
Erie Otters players
HC CSKA Moscow players
HC Dinamo Minsk players
JYP Jyväskylä players
Lokomotiv Yaroslavl players
Naturalized citizens of Belarus
North Bay Centennials players
Portland Pirates players
Saginaw Spirit players
Salavat Yulaev Ufa players
Ice hockey people from Toronto
Syracuse Crunch players
Tappara players
Undrafted National Hockey League players
Växjö Lakers players